Nicola Curtin is an English academic. She is Professor of Experimental Cancer Therapeutics at Newcastle University. She is best known for being part of the Newcastle University team that developed Rubraca, a PARP inhibitor used as an anti-cancer agent addressing BRCA mutation, and for donating her share of the royalties to charity.

Education
Curtin received her undergraduate degree in Biology from the University of York in 1975.  She studied liver carcinogenesis and received her MSc from the University of Manchester in 1977 followed by her PhD from the University of Surrey in 1981.

Research 

Curtin is a team leader at the Northern Institute for Cancer Research at Newcastle University.  She has been teaching and doing research at the university since 1982.  Curtin's research is currently focused on DNA-damage response and has received 15 patents as of 2019. She was one of the researchers behind the development of Rubraca, which has been approved for use by the National Health Service in cases of ovarian cancer. Newcastle University sold the royalties for Rubraca for $31 million.

Curtin's academic publications have been cited over 17,000 times, resulting in an h-index of 64 and an i10-index of 156.

Curtin PARP Fund at the Community Foundation Tyne & Wear and Northumberland
Curtin used the royalties she received from Rubraca (around £865,000) to establish the Curtin PARP (Passionate About Realising your Potential) Fund at the Community Foundation in Tyne & Wear and Northumberland, which is a non-profit organization that matches funds to different community causes.  It is aimed at helping disadvantaged people gain access to education and employment opportunities.  Curtin was inspired to create this fund by the realization that despite the years of hard work, the monetary success was largely due to luck.

Selected publications

References

External links
Newcastle University bio

1954 births
Living people
Women medical researchers
Cancer researchers
Academics of Newcastle University
Alumni of the University of York
Alumni of the University of Manchester
Alumni of the University of Surrey